Gogne is a town in western Eritrea. It is the capital of the Gogne district in the Gash-Barka region.

References
Gogne, Eritrea Page

Gash-Barka Region
Populated places in Eritrea